Kanti is a 2004 Kannada-language romance drama film directed by debutant S. Bharath, starring Murali and Ramya. The music for the film was composed by Gurukiran.

The plot revolves around a Kannada college student who on falling in love with a Marathi girl, gets embroiled politically.

Plot

Cast
 Murali as Srikantha "Kanti"
 Ramya as Reema
 Govind Namdev as Samblekar
 Gurumurthy
 Avinash as SP
 Kishore as Beera
 Pawan Kumar
 Chandru
 Vinayak Joshi as Chidanand
 Venkata Rao
 Malathi Sardeshpande as Bharathi Devi, a lecturer
 Mumtaj in a special appearance in "Ussaaru Ussaaru" song

Production 
The film takes place in Belgaum, a city in Karnataka that has a sizeable Marathi-speaking population. The film was shot in Bangalore and Belgaum.

Soundtrack 
The film's music was composed by Gurukiran.

Release and reception 
The release of the film was delayed after the film was sent to the censor revision committee.

A critic from Sify wrote that "Debutant director Bharat has taken care over the script that is convincing". A critic from Deccan Herald wrote that "Debutant director Bharat has handled the controversial Kannada-Maratha issue with all seriousness".

Box office 
The film was a box office success. After the success of this film, Murali did not have a single successful film till the release of Ugramm (2014).

Awards
In 2004–05 Karnataka State Film Awards, Murali won Best Actor, T Shashi Kumar won Best Editing and Kishore won the Best Supporting Actor awards.

References

External links
 

2004 films
2000s Kannada-language films
Films scored by Gurukiran
Films set in Karnataka
2004 directorial debut films
2000s masala films
Indian romantic drama films
2004 romantic drama films